The second season of Cobra Kai, stylized as COBRA KAII, was released on YouTube Premium on April 24, 2019, and consisted of 10 episodes. The series is a direct sequel to the original four films in The Karate Kid franchise, focusing on the characters of Daniel LaRusso and Johnny Lawrence over 30 years after the original film. This is the final season to be originally released on YouTube's streaming service as Netflix would acquire the streaming rights to Cobra Kai following YouTube's decision not to renew the series past a third season.

The season had nine starring roles, six of which returned from the first season and the other three consisting of previously recurring and guest cast members, Jacob Bertrand, Gianni DeCenzo, and Martin Kove, all of whom received promotions. Leo Birenberg and Zach Robinson composed a soundtrack album to accompany the season. The season received generally positive reviews from critics, although they deemed it to be inferior to the first season. The season also received multiple awards and nominations including an Emmy award, and achieved record setting viewing figures.

Cast and characters

Main
 Ralph Macchio as Daniel LaRusso
 William Zabka as Johnny Lawrence
 Courtney Henggeler as Amanda LaRusso
 Xolo Maridueña as Miguel Diaz
 Tanner Buchanan as Robby Keene
 Mary Mouser as Samantha LaRusso
 Jacob Bertrand as Eli "Hawk" Moskowitz
 Gianni DeCenzo as Demetri Alexopoulos
 Martin Kove as John Kreese

Recurring
 Vanessa Rubio as Carmen Diaz
 Nichole Brown as Aisha Robinson
 Hannah Kepple as Moon
 Owen Morgan as Bert
 Aedin Mincks as Mitch
 Khalil Everage as Chris
 Paul Walter Hauser as Raymond "Stingray" Porter
 Dan Ahdoot as Anoush
 Griffin Santopietro as Anthony LaRusso
 Peyton List as Tory Nichols
 Nathaniel Oh as Nathaniel

Notable guests
 Diora Baird as Shannon Keene
 Susan Gallagher as Homeless Lynn
 Terayle Hill as Trey
 Jeff Kaplan as Cruz
 Ken Davitian as Armand Zarkarian
 Kim Fields as Sandra Robinson
 Rob Garrison as Tommy
 Ron Thomas as Bobby Brown
 Tony O'Dell as Jimmy
 Randee Heller as Lucille LaRusso
 Selah Austria as Piper
 Rose Bianco as Rosa

Episodes

Production

Development
Six days after the first season's release, YouTube renewed the series for a second season in May 2018. Series creators Josh Heald, Jon Hurwitz, and Hayden Schlossberg continued to serve as showrunners, executive producers, writers, and directors for the season. Production began in late that year and the season consists of ten episodes. James Lassiter and Caleeb Pinkett also returned as executive producers alongside production companies Overbrook Entertainment and Sony Pictures Television Studios. Following the season's release YouTube renewed the series for a third season.

Casting
Ralph Macchio and William Zabka continued to appear as Daniel LaRusso and Johnny Lawrence, respectively. Xolo Maridueña, Tanner Buchanan, Mary Mouser, and Courtney Henggeler were also confirmed to return. Martin Kove, who had guest starred in the first season finale, joined the season as a series regular, reprising the role John Kreese, from the first three films in the franchise. Jacob Bertrand and Gianni DeCenzo who recurred throughout the first season were also promoted to series regulars. Paul Walter Hauser and Peyton List were cast in recurring roles for the season. Additionally, other actors from the film franchise including Rob Garrison, Ron Thomas, Tony O'Dell, and Randee Haller made guest appearances during the season.

Filming
The season utilized soundstages at Pinewood Atlanta Studios where filming took place on October 17-19, 2018. Principal photography also took place earlier that month around Marietta, Georgia, on October 15. Additional filming later took place in Union City on November 8. Filming was also spotted at the closed Rio Bravo restaurant from November 28–29. Additional filming locations for the season included the Tybee Island pier, the North DeKalb Mall, Westview Cemetery, and Marietta City Hall. The Los Angeles, California neighborhoods Encino, Norwalk, Reseda, and Tarzana also served as filming locales. Filming concluded in December.

Music
Featured music from the season primarily highlighted music from the 1980s, including the bands AC/DC, Airbourne, and Bananarama, as well as present day bands such as Fifth Harmony.

Soundtrack

Madison Gate Records released a digital soundtrack album, on April 24, 2019, to accompany the season. La-La Land Records released a deluxe edition of the soundtrack via CD, featuring nine additional tracks, on January 19 the same year. Leo Birenberg and Zach Robinson continued to serve as composers for the second season.

Track listing

Marketing and release
YouTube Premium released a six-minute commercial parodying ESPN's 30 for 30 in April 2019, featuring the main cast members and select ESPN personalities analyzing the 1984 match between Daniel and Johnny. When the season's renewal was announced it was reported that the season would premiere on the subscription-based streaming video on demand platform YouTube Red. Prior to the season's release the streaming service name was changed to YouTube Premium. The season was released on April 24. A potential move of the series to Netflix was also explored prior to the season's release when YouTube chose to shift its focus on original content from scripted to unscripted. As part of this shift episodes of the season were made free to view beginning in September as YouTube also shifted to an advertisement supported service rather than subscription supported. Although YouTube originally released the season it was the final season to be released on the platform with all subsequent seasons being moved to Netflix. YouTube did however maintain the rights to continue streaming the service on a non-exclusive basis, alongside Netflix which released the first two seasons on August 28, 2020.

Reception

Critical response

On the review aggregator website Rotten Tomatoes the season holds a 90% approval rating with an average rating 7.4 out of 10, based on 31 reviews. The website critical consensus reads: "While Cobra Kai's subversive kick no longer carries the same gleeful impact of its inaugural season, its second round is still among the best around -- no amount of mid-life crisis and teenage ennui's ever gonna keep it down".  On Metacritic, the season has a weighted average score of 66 out of 100, based on reviews from 7 critics indicating "generally favorable reviews". 
Alex McLevy writing for The A.V. Club said that the season felt to be a "witty relaunch of a beloved film" and that with "half the humor and double the melodrama" of the first season McLevy compared it to that of a soap opera. Alan Sepinwall from Rolling Stone similarly wrote that the season is "leaning too hard on nostalgia and a soapy teen love triangle". Den of Geek Andrew Husband disagreed saying that although the season had its issues, that it had "some of the most exciting creative storytelling" of recent television. Kristen Baldwin from Entertainment Weekly wrote that despite the series being based on a 1980s film, it doesn't live in the past, and that the season "hits viewers with bursts of nostalgia endorphins, leaving us giddy and defenseless against the next emotional wallop". IGN reviewer David Griffin stated that he was initially skeptical of Martin Kove's addition to the main cast but that his character later adds a dynamic to the season and raises its stakes. Hanh Nguyn of IndieWire said the season helps "capture the energy of 1980's cinema" and praised the addition of cast members such as Peyton List, who Nguyn said brings a "fresh and energetic immediacy to the conflicts". When reviewing the first two seasons together after its release on Netflix, The Telegraphs Ed Power wrote that the series "is aware, that times have changed and that in the grown-up world there are problems that can't be solved by a punch to the solar plexus or a sneaky scissor kick".

Awards and nominations
At the 71st Primetime Creative Arts Emmy Awards the season was nominated for an Emmy award in the Outstanding Stunt Coordination for a Comedy Series or Variety Program category, but the award went to GLOW, a television series on Netflix. A 2019 Teen Choice Awards nomination was also picked up for Choice Summer TV Series, which was ultimately awarded to the third season of Stranger Things, which also airs on Netflix. The extended promotional trailer, "Cobra Kai 30 for 30", was nominated for a Clio Award, an award program that specifically issues awards for advertising; This award was lost to Netflix's When They See Us for an advertisement named "Room to Room".

Viewing figures
Within three days of the season's release it was reported that it was 136% more in demand than the first season was in the same three-day period. The season was the most in demand original streaming series during the first seven days of its release, beating the second place holder, Hulu's The Act, by 41%. It was also reported that the season generated more demand than the second season releases of The Handmaid's Tale, The Marvelous Mrs. Maisel, and Atlanta in their seven-day window. "Mercy Part II", the season's premiere episode, had been seen by 20 million viewers within six days, the fastest period for a YouTube original to do so at the time. A week later the season remained the most in demand original streaming series, raising 20% from the week prior. Prior to the season's release on Netflix data showed that it was already the most demanded series on the service, beating both The Frozen Ground and Lucifer which had already been released. Once the first and second season were released on Netflix together the series gained 2.17 billion streaming minutes after seven days across its then 20-episodes. The following month the series topped Netflix's most-viewed series list for the entire 30-day period. Netflix reported that 50 million accounts viewed at least two minutes of an episode during that time period.

References

External links
  on YouTube
 

2019 American television seasons
Cobra Kai